Jared Verse (born November 4, 2000) is an American football defensive end for the Florida State Seminoles. He previously played for the Albany Great Danes, where he was named the 2020 Colonial Athletic Association (CAA) Defensive Rookie of the Year before transferring to Florida State in 2022.

Early life and high school
Verse was born on November 4, 2000, in Dayton, Ohio. He grew up in Berwick, Pennsylvania, later attending Central Columbia High School and played tight end and defensive end for their football team.

College career
Verse redshirted his freshman season at Albany. He made 22 tackles with 10 tackles for loss and four sacks over four games during his redshirt freshman season, which was shortened and played in early 2021 due to the COVID-19 pandemic. He was named second-team All-Colonial Athletic Association (CAA) and won the conference's Defensive Rookie of the Year award. In 2021, Verse was named first-team All-CAA after finishing the season with 75 tackles, 21.5 tackles for loss, 14.5 sacks, and two forced fumbles.

In 2022, Verse announced he was transferring to Florida State University to play for the Seminoles. He finished his first season with the Seminoles with 47 tackles, 16.5 tackles for loss, and 9 sacks.

On January 7, 2023, on the one year anniversary of his commitment to Florida State, Verse announced he would return for the 2023 season.

References

External links

Florida State Seminoles bio
Albany Great Danes bio

Living people
Players of American football from Ohio
American football defensive ends
Florida State Seminoles football players
Albany Great Danes football players
African-American players of American football
2000 births